Lola Montez is a 1919 German silent film directed by Rudolf Walther-Fein and starring Hans Albers, Marija Leiko and Oscar Marion. It is a loose sequel to the 1918 film Lola Montez, and is sometimes known by the alternative titles of Lola Montez, Part II. or Lola Montez, In the Court of King Ludwig I of Bavaria.

Plot summary

Cast
In alphabetical order
 Hans Albers 
 Marija Leiko 
 Oscar Marion 
 Gustav Adolf Semler 
 Maria Zelenka

References

Bibliography
 Richter, Simon. Women, Pleasure, Film: What Lolas Want. Palgrave Macmillan, 2013.

External links
 

1919 films
Films directed by Rudolf Walther-Fein
German silent feature films
Films of the Weimar Republic
Films set in the 19th century
Cultural depictions of Lola Montez
German black-and-white films
1910s German films